The 1992 United States Senate election in Missouri was held on November 3, 1992. Incumbent Republican U.S. Senator Kit Bond won re-election to a second term.

Major candidates

Democratic
 Geri Rothman-Serot, St. Louis County Councilwoman

Republican
 Kit Bond, incumbent U.S. Senator since 1987

Results

See also
 1992 United States Senate elections

References

Missouri
1992
1992 Missouri elections